The following lists events that happened during 2015 in the Republic of the Sudan.

Incumbents
President: Omar al-Bashir
Vice President:
 Bakri Hassan Saleh (First)
 Hassabu Mohamed Abdalrahman (Second)

Events

April
 April 2 - The Sudanese general election, 2015 was won by Omar al-Bashir although the credibility of the election was marred by an opposition boycott. Sudan is a one-party state and opposition parties are not considered to have a chance of coming to power.

May
 May 25 - Sudan denies allegations that it is supporting rebels in South Sudan threatening oil fields.

References

 
2010s in Sudan
Sudan
Sudan
Years of the 21st century in Sudan